Widow is a 1976 American TV film directed by J. Lee Thompson from a script by Barbara Turner. It was based on a memoir by publicist Lynne Caine.

Premise
A woman is widowed when her husband dies of cancer, meaning she has to look after their two children.

Cast
Michael Learned
Farley Granger
Bradford Dillman
Carol Rossen
Michelle Stacy
Amzie Strickland
Eric Olson
Louise Sorel
Kate Woodville
Carmen Mathews
Robert Lansing

Production
The film was made by Lorimar who also made The Waltons. Star of that show, Michael Learned, was the star of Widow. Learned called it "the best script I've seen for TV or movies since I came to Hollywood." It was shot at Burbank Studios in May 1975.

Reception
The Los Angeles Times called it "resourcefully made" with "an admirably tough minded and comprehensive script."

References

External links
Widow at IMDb
Widow at BFI
Widow at BFI

1976 films
1976 television films
American television films
Films directed by J. Lee Thompson